Fawad is a Pakistani given name. It may refer to:

 Fawad Ahmed (born 1982), Pakistani-Australian cricketer
 Fawad Alam (born 1985), Pakistani cricketer
 Fawad Ali (born 1986), Pakistani cricketer
 Fawad Chaudhry, Pakistani politician
 Fawad Hasan Fawad (born 1960), Pakistani politician
 Fawad Jalal, Pakistani actor
 Fawad Khan (born 1981), Pakistani actor
 Fawad Khan (cricketer) (born 1986), Pakistani cricketer
 Fawad Rana, owner of the Lahore Qalandars cricket team

See also
 Tehseen Fawad, Pakistani politician